Angelo Bertolazzi (21 September 1896 – 12 February 1963) was an Italian sculptor. His work was part of the sculpture event in the art competition at the 1932 Summer Olympics.

References

1896 births
1963 deaths
20th-century Italian sculptors
20th-century Italian male artists
Italian male sculptors
Olympic competitors in art competitions
Artists from Milan